Gateway United FC is a football club based in Abeokuta, Ogun State. They currently play in the second division of the Nigeria league sysem, (Nigeria National league).

They play their home matches at the MKO Abiola International Stadium, Abeokuta.

Former coaches
 Loveday Omoruyi
 Ogunbote Ayodeji
 Philip Boamah
 Henry Nwosu
 Olabode Awakan
 Samuel Abimbola

Current team
As of May 2018

External links
Abeokuta to host Gateway, Wolves match
Gateway opens stadium with victory over Kaduna United
Gateway initiate debt-free campaign(Punch)
Gateway Fires Omoruyi, Others
Gateway Beat Akwa Starlets 2-1 
Awakan vows to demolish Remo Stars in Ogun State FA Cup final 
Gateway FC sacks Awakan, appoints Abimbola

Football clubs in Nigeria
Ogun State
Association football clubs established in 1998
1998 establishments in Nigeria
Sports clubs in Nigeria